Abraxas pantaria, the light magpie or spotted ash looper is a species of moth belonging to the family Geometridae. It was described by Carl Linnaeus in 1767. It is found in the Mediterranean and is common in Portugal and Spain. It is also known from the United Kingdom, Ireland, Croatia, Armenia and Georgia south-eastern Russia and Turkey.

The wingspan is 38–42 mm for females and 35–40 mm for males. Adults are white to creamy (bone colour). The head, thorax and abdomen have light brown hairs and the thorax and each abdominal segment has dark brown spots. The wings are white, although the base of the wings is darker, almost the same colour of thorax. The forewings have light brown spots toward the apical margin very close to the middle, forming an irregular band. The hindwings have smaller spots.

The larvae feed on the leaves of Fraxinus excelsior and are considered a pest. The newly hatched caterpillars mostly feed on the lower epidermis and parenchyma tissue, leaving a network of veins. As the caterpillars grow, the size of these grooves increases. Infested leaves usually dry and turn brownish in time. The damage caused can be significant and some trees may be completely defoliated. There are five instars.

References

External links

Light Magpie at UKMoths
Moths and Butterflies of Europe and North Africa
Lepiforum e.V.

Abraxini
Moths described in 1767
Moths of Europe
Moths of Asia
Taxa named by Carl Linnaeus